Ángel María José Ignacio Francisco Xavier de Iturbide y Huarte (October 2, 1816 — July 21, 1872) was the second son of Agustín de Iturbide and Ana María Huarte who received the title of Mexican Prince during the First Mexican Empire by the Constituent Congress.

In 1854 he was appointed Secretary of the Mexican Legation in the United States. He married Alice Forrest Green (Alicia Grin y Forrest), daughter of a US Army captain, from the District of Columbia. Alice was reputed to be one of the great beauties of American society salons during the American Civil War. In this marriage was born Agustín de Iturbide y Green, grandson by male line of the first Mexican emperor and Heir Presumptive of Maximilian von Habsburg, emperor of Second Mexican Empire.

Decree 
The Sovereign Mexican Constituent Congress decreed on June 22, 1822 the following:

Art 1 °. The Mexican Monarchy, in addition to being moderate and Constitutional, is also hereditary.
Art 2 °. Consequently, the Nation calls the succession of the Crown for the death of the current Emperor, his firstborn son Don Agustín Jerónimo de Iturbide. The Constitution of the Empire will decide the order of succession of the throne.
Art 3 °. The crown prince will be called "Prince Imperial" and will have the treatment of Imperial Highness.
Art 4 °. The legitimate sons and daughters of H.I.M will be called "Mexican Princes", and will have the treatment of Highness.
Art 5 °. Don José Joaquín de Iturbide y Arreguí, Father of H.I.M, is decorated with the title of "Prince of the Union" and the treatment of Highness, during his life.
Art 6 °. It is also granted the title of "Princess of Iturbide" and the treatment of Highness, during his life, to Doña María Nicolasa de Iturbide y Arámburo, sister of the Emperor.

Ancestry

References 

1816 births
1872 deaths
House of Iturbide
Sons of emperors
Nobility of the Americas